Anjaneyulu is an Indian name based on the Hindu God Hanuman or Anjaneya meaning son of Añjanā.

Anjaneyulu may also refer to:

 Anjaneyulu (film), 2009 Telugu film
 Chilakalapudi Seetha Rama Anjaneyulu (1907–1963), Telugu actor
 Kundurti Anjaneyulu (1922–1982), Telugu poet
 Sitarama Anjaneyulu, the birth name of Sri Bharati Tirtha

Hindu given names
Indian given names
Telugu names
Telugu given names